Rampur Bushahr is a town and a municipal council in Shimla district in the Indian state of Himachal Pradesh.  It is about 130 km from Shimla and is well connected with NH 5 which passes through Theog, Narkanda and Kumarsain.

History

The principality of Bushahr (also known as Bashahar, Bushahar, Bashahr) was once among the largest of the twenty-eight Shimla Hill States under the administration of the British Raj keen to invest on regional and transcontinental trade and exploit Himalayan resources. Caught in one of the British imperial enterprise,  it was subjected to political-cum-economic vicissitudes, acceding to the Indian Union in 1947. On 8 March 1948, along with twenty other princely hill States of Punjab and Shimla, Bashahr signed an agreement which resulted in its inclusion in the Indian State of Himachal Pradesh.

Rampur, a small township situated at 1,005 meters on the left bank of the Sutlej, served as Bushahar's winter capital. Being well connected with major trading routes that joined Indian markets with Central Asia and Tibet, it buzzed with mercantile activity, especially in November during the Lavi fair, the largest trading event in the north Himalayas attracting traders from Kashmir, Ladakh, Yarkand, and the Indian mainland.  Concerning the origins of the Rampuri fair, the Census of India (1961) reports:

"About three hundred years ago during the regime of Raja Kehar Singh of Bushahr, a trade treaty was signed between the Bushahr State and Tibet…Horses from Tibet and swords from Bushahr were exchanged in token of this friendship. It was written in the treaty that their friendly relations would continue till this time…Since then, it is presumed that trade relations increased and eventually [the] Lavi fair was held."

Rampur was also located along pilgrimage routes to sacred sites in western Tibet shared by Hindus, Bön and Buddhists alike, i.e., Mount Kailash and Lake Mansarovar.  Missionary and pilgrimage activities, intensified by trading possibilities, created the conditions for Tibetan Buddhism to take a firm stronghold in these borderland regions. Twenty-two kilometres from the village of Namgya in upper Kinnaur,  laid the Shipki pass which linked caravan routes to and from western Tibet. This treacherous transcontinental passage must have been in use from ancient times, for among the ruined castles reported by Francke at Shipki village, there were no living memories of the origins of mKar gog, the oldest of them built above the village in cyclopean style. Rampur also has Hydro Power Stations namely, Nathpa Jhakri Power Station (1500 MW) and Rampur Hydro Power Station (412 MW) by SJVN Ltd. A second castle, known as Seng ge mkhar, is said to have received its crooked ground plan “through a race round its base executed in opposite directions by a poisonous snake and a scorpion,” and was built, in all probability, during the Ladakhi occupation of mNga’ ris by orders of King Seng ge rnam rgyal (1570–1642) and called after him.

Geography
It has an average elevation of 1021 metres (4429 feet). It is a very beautiful place situated at the bank of the Satluj river. It borders on the north with Nirmand, on the west with Kumarsain and Anni, on the east with Kinnaur and on the south with Rohru. The city is nearby to popular places like Jhakri, Sarahan Bushahr, Green valley Bara Bish and Shraikoti to name a few. The city is also the home to Asia's Largest underground Hydro Power Project - The Nathpa Jhakri Hydro Power Station built by Satluj Jal Vidyut Nigam Ltd (formerly known as Nathpa Jhakri Power Corporation) at Jhakri with dam sight at nathpa in Kinnaur and world's deepest Surge shaft at a Shah (22 km from Rampur).

See also 

 Rampur chaddar
 Lavi Fair
 Govt. PG College Rampur Bushahr
 Bushahr

References

External links
 Photographs of Rampur-Bushahr  in SAS-Space

Cities and towns in Shimla district